Steven Brent Oedekerk (born November 27, 1961) is an American actor, stand-up comedian, director, editor, producer, and screenwriter. He is best known for his collaborations with actor and comedian Jim Carrey and director Tom Shadyac (particularly the Ace Ventura franchise), his series of "Thumbmation" shorts and his film Kung Pow! Enter the Fist (2002), along with his films Jimmy Neutron: Boy Genius, Santa vs. the Snowman 3D, Barnyard and The Nutty Professor remake.

Early life 
Oedekerk was raised in Huntington Beach, California, by his mother Rena Borlandeli and father Martin Oedekerk. He attended Mater Dei High School in Santa Ana, California and Golden West College in Huntington Beach. He is of Dutch Frisian, Irish, Hungarian and Italian (Lombard) descent. His mother is an emigrant from Magnago, Italy. His paternal grandfather was an Afrikaner born in South Africa to Dutch parents. On February 15, 2019, Oedekerk's father Martin died.

Career 
Throughout his career, Oedekerk has appeared in and created several television specials for NBC, ABC, and UPN. He also contributed his writing talents to FOX during the late 1980s  and through the early 1990s. It was during this time that Oedekerk befriended fellow comic/actor Jim Carrey while working on the television series In Living Color during its 1990–1994 run; this was the first of numerous collaborations between the two.

Prior to his successful contributions to several unknown episodes in the Color TV series, he wrote and starred in his first independent/directorial film, Smart Alex (1987). It wasn't until 1991 that Oedekerk was attached not only as a writer, but also as the protagonist, as Thane Furrows in the film High Strung. Jim Carrey also starred opposite him in the role of Death, although he went uncredited. They eventually developed a strong friendship, which still exists today. Shortly afterward, Oedekerk again worked alongside Carrey as the project consultant for Tom Shadyac's first film Ace Ventura: Pet Detective (1994). The film became a break-out success and he was given the opportunity to both direct and write its sequel, Ace Ventura: When Nature Calls (1995). This time Oedekerk directed and wrote the movie after Shadyac left before filming. The sequel proved to be more successful, surpassing the box office gross of the original. Despite this, both Oedekerk and Carrey wanted to pursue other projects, but still remained friends.

Following the Ace Ventura franchise, Oedekerk co-wrote The Nutty Professor (1996), which was also directed by Shadyac for Universal Pictures; it became one of the highest-grossing films of that year.  He soon wrote, directed and also had a cameo appearance in Nothing to Lose (1997), starring Tim Robbins and Martin Lawrence. Oedekerk took a hiatus from directing major film productions for the rest of the 1990s, but continued to write screenplays, including Patch Adams (1998), Nutty Professor II: The Klumps (2000), Jimmy Neutron: Boy Genius (2001), Kung Pow! Enter the Fist (2002) (which he directed, wrote and starred in), Bruce Almighty (2003) and Barnyard (2006) (which he directed, wrote, produced, and voiced various characters). In 2003, he signed a first look deal with Universal.

In 2007, Oedekerk produced the screenplay and story for the Bruce Almighty sequel, Evan Almighty; again, Shadyac directed both films. He has also been commissioned to write the screenplay for the Ripley's Believe It or Not! film adaptation; Jim Carrey has since been cast in the title role. No news involving the project has been reported since.

In February 2009, Universal Pictures announced that Steve Oedekerk would be penning a film adaptation of the Stretch Armstrong superhero doll. As of 2016, the film is left in development hell with an animated series currently in the works.

In 2015, it was announced that a sequel to Kung Pow is currently in the works with him returning to write and direct.

O Entertainment 

O Entertainment is a production company founded by Steve Oedekerk in 1990. O Entertainment's productions include the Thumbmation series (Thumb Wars, Bat Thumb, Thumbtanic, etc.), Santa vs. the Snowman 3D, Jimmy Neutron: The Boy Genius, The Adventures of Jimmy Neutron, Boy Genius, Back at the Barnyard, Planet Sheen, and the movie The Super Mouse. The animation division, Omation Animation Studio, was founded by Oedekerk himself and hired animators who previously worked in DNA Productions after the studio closed down in 2006.

In 1990, Oedekerk founded an entertainment company, O Entertainment. In 1997, he created and starred in a variety special for NBC, featuring computer animation, entitled The O Show (also known as steve.oedekerk.com). He is also executive producer of the computer animated series The Adventures of Jimmy Neutron, Boy Genius on Nickelodeon.

Omation Animation Studio 

Omation Animation Studio (commonly known as Omation) is an animation studio founded by the same founder who founded O Entertainment, Steve Oedekerk. In 2002, he founded the animation division of O Entertainment, Omation Animation Studio (better known as Omation), whose first animation project was the feature film Barnyard (which Oedekerk wrote, directed, produced, and voice acted in). Around 2006–2007, the studio began production on a Nicktoon based on the film titled Back at the Barnyard. The series premiered on Nickelodeon on September 29, 2007. A second season followed, and six additional episodes airing on Nickelodeon's sister channel Nicktoons from September 12, 2011, until November 12, 2011.

Oedekerk also gained popularity with his series of "Thumbmation" shorts: Thumb Wars, Bat Thumb, The Godthumb, Frankenthumb, The Blair Thumb and Thumbtanic.

Filmography

Film 

Executive consultant
 Ace Ventura: Pet Detective (1994)

Acting roles

Television 

Acting roles

References

External links 
Steve Oedekerk on Internet Movie Database
O Entertainment on Internet Movie Database
https://www.oedework.com/

1961 births
Living people
American people of Afrikaner descent
American people of Dutch descent
American people of Frisian descent
American people of Hungarian descent
American people of Irish descent
American people of Lombard descent
American people of South African descent
American male comedians
American male film actors
Film producers from California
American male screenwriters
American male voice actors
American television writers
American writers of Italian descent
Comedians from California
Film directors from California
Male actors from Los Angeles
American male television writers
Nickelodeon Animation Studio people
Showrunners
Screenwriters from California
20th-century American male actors
21st-century American comedians
21st-century American screenwriters
21st-century American male writers
American people of Italian descent